Mogadishu is the largest city in Somalia and the nation's capital.

Mogadishu may also refer to:

Port of Mogadishu, the largest harbour in Somalia
Little Mogadishu, the Cedar-Riverside region of Minneapolis
Mogadishu University, a non-governmental university in the Somali capital of Mogadishu
Diocese of Mogadishu, of the Roman Catholic Church
Mogadishu Line, the point at which foreign involvement in a conflict shifts from peacekeeping or diplomacy to combat operations
Mogadishu Mile, a route taken by American soldiers during the Battle of Mogadishu in 1993
Mogadishu (play), a play by Vivienne Franzmann
Mogadischu (film) (2008), directed by Roland Suso Richter and about the hijacking

See also
Battle of Mogadishu (disambiguation)
Mogadishu bombings (disambiguation)